The Apollo Fox is a Hungarian ultralight and light-sport aircraft produced by Apollo Ultralight Aircraft, of Eger. The aircraft is supplied complete ready-to-fly.

Design and development
The Apollo Fox was derived from the Aeropro Eurofox, which itself was a metric adaptation of the Denney Kitfox. The Kitfox in turn is a derivative of the Avid Flyer. The Apollo Fox was adapted to comply with the Fédération Aéronautique Internationale microlight rules and US light-sport aircraft rules. It features a strut-braced high-wing, a two-seats-in-side-by-side configuration enclosed cockpit, fixed tricycle landing gear or optionally conventional landing gear and a single engine in tractor configuration.

The aircraft fuselage is made from welded steel tubing, while the wing is built with aluminum spars and ribs. The fuselage and flying surfaces are covered in doped aircraft fabric. Its  span wing is supported by V-struts and jury struts and features Junkers-style ailerons. Standard engines available are the  Rotax 582 two-stroke, the  Rotax 912UL and the  Rotax 912ULS four-stroke powerplant.

The aircraft's wings fold for storage or ground transportation and can be folded by one person in ten minutes.

Operational history

Specifications (Fox)

References

External links

Official website

1990s Hungarian ultralight aircraft
Homebuilt aircraft
Light-sport aircraft
Single-engined tractor aircraft
Apollo Ultralight Aircraft aircraft